Patukh is a village in the Wakhan, Badakhshan Province in north-eastern Afghanistan.

Patukh is inhabited by Wakhi people.  The population of the village (2003) is 405.

See also
Badakhshan Province

References

External links
Satellite map at Maplandia.com

Populated places in Wakhan District